Homer Rieger (November 26, 1933 – August 7, 1995) was an American politician. He served as a Republican member for the 40th district of the Oklahoma House of Representatives.

Life and career 
Rieger was born in Enid, Oklahoma. He served in the United States Navy.

In 1979, Rieger was elected to represent the 40th district of the Oklahoma House of Representatives, succeeding Thomas Rogers. He served until 1989, when he was succeeded by James Sears Bryant.

Rieger died in August 1995 of cancer, at the age of 61.

References 

1933 births
1995 deaths
Politicians from Enid, Oklahoma
Republican Party members of the Oklahoma House of Representatives
20th-century Members of the Oklahoma House of Representatives
20th-century American politicians
Deaths from cancer